Barbara Mary Ansell, CBE, FRCP, FRCS (30 August 1923 – 14 September 2001) was the founder of paediatric rheumatology. Ansell was notable for outstanding contributions to the advancement of paediatric knowledge, specifically defining chronic joint disorders and the improvement of their management.

Life
Ansell was educated at King's High School for Girls. She qualified at the University of Birmingham in 1946 and did her post-graduate training at the Royal Postgraduate Medical School in Hammersmith. In 1951 she was appointed as registrar to Professor Eric Bywaters at the Canadian Red Cross Memorial Hospital, Taplow, Buckinghamshire, where she conducted research on heart disease in rheumatic fever.

Career
Ansell was based at the Canadian Red Cross Memorial Hospital, specializing in the research and treatment of Juvenile Idiopathic Arthritis. She developed a classification system for childhood arthritis. While focusing on treatment of the disease, she recognised the importance of maintaining educational and social skills in young patients.

She pioneered a team system of professionals including physiotherapists, occupational therapists, nurses, teachers, social workers, ophthalmologists, orthopaedic surgeons, dentists, and podiatrists in order to treat and manage her patients.

In 1962, Ansell was appointed consultant clinical physician in rheumatology at Taplow. She was appointed head of Division of Rheumatology at the Clinical Research Centre at Northwick Park Hospital in 1976. She was awarded a scholarship to study in Chicago at the Research and Education Hospital as a research fellow. In 1997, Ansell was recognised with a Visiting Professorship at Leeds in 1997.
 
"During her life she made a major contribution to the understanding of children with Juvenile Idiopathic Arthritis and in developing services to treat them in the United Kingdom. Her influence was not restricted to this country, and by the time she retired from the Health Service in 1988, she was the world leader in the care of childhood arthritis."

Ansell was author of over 360 papers in adult and pediatric rheumatology and was an honorary member or fellow of over 16 national and international societies.

Ansell died from ovarian cancer, aged 78, and a memorial service was held in Southwark Cathedral on 16 February 2002. Her husband, Angus Weston, predeceased her. They had no children.

After her death, a new science building at the Kings High School for Girls, and a street in Warwick (Ansell Way), were named in her honour.

Bibliography
 Clinics in Rheumatic Diseases (W. B. Saunders, 1976 London)
 Chronic Ailments in Childhood (1976)
 Rheumatic Disorders in Childhood (Postgraduate Paediatrics) (Butterworth-Heinemann Ltd), 
 Color Atlas of Pediatric Rheumatology (Mosby, 1991),

Awards and honours
 CBE in 1982

References

External links
  
 

British paediatricians
Women pediatricians
British rheumatologists
Fellows of the Royal College of Physicians
Commanders of the Order of the British Empire
People from Warwick
Deaths from ovarian cancer
1923 births
2001 deaths
Fellows of the Royal College of Surgeons
Place of death missing
People educated at The King's High School for Girls
Recipients of the James Spence Medal
Women rheumatologists
20th-century women physicians
20th-century British medical doctors